Grunewald is the name of both a locality and a forest in Germany:

 Grunewald (forest)
 Grunewald (locality)

Grünewald may refer to:
 Grünewald (surname)
 Grünewald, Germany, a municipality in Brandenburg, Germany
 Grünewald (Luxembourg), a forest in Luxembourg
 Matthias-Grünewald-Verlag, a publishing house in Mainz

See also
 
 Greenwald
 Grindelwald (disambiguation)
 Grünwald (disambiguation)
 Grunwald (disambiguation)